Phyllosphingia is a monotypic moth genus in the family Sphingidae erected by Charles Swinhoe in 1897. Its only species, Phyllosphingia dissimilis, the buff-leaf hawkmoth, was described by Otto Vasilievich Bremer in 1861.

Distribution 
It is known from the south-eastern Russian Far East, eastern and central China, Taiwan, the Korean Peninsula and Japan. There is also a record from Luzon in the Philippines. Subspecies P. d. perundulans is found from Nepal, east through north-eastern India, Myanmar and northern Thailand to southwestern China. The habitat consists of open parklands and forest edges.

Description 
The wingspan is 93–130 mm.

Biology 
There is one generation per year in northern China, with adults on wing from May to July. Farther south, there are two generations. Adults have been recorded from mid-May to mid-August in Korea.

The larvae have been recorded feeding on Carya cathayensis, Juglans mandschurica and Juglans regia in China, Juglans mandschurica in Primorskiy Kray and Prunus serrulata var. spontanea in Korea.

Subspecies
Phyllosphingia dissimilis dissimilis (south-eastern Russian Far East, eastern and central China, Taiwan, the Korean Peninsula and Japan. There is also a record from Luzon)
Phyllosphingia dissimilis perundulans C. Swinhoe, 1897 (from Nepal, east through north-eastern India, Myanmar and northern Thailand to southwestern China)

References

Smerinthini
Monotypic moth genera
Moths of Asia
Taxa named by Charles Swinhoe
Moths described in 1861